A candlestick is a device used to hold a candle in place. Candlesticks have a cup or a spike ("pricket") or both to keep the candle in place. Candlesticks are less frequently called "candleholders".

Before the proliferation of electricity, candles were carried between rooms using a chamberstick, a short candlestick with a pan to catch dripping wax.

Although electric lighting has phased out candles in much of the world, candlesticks and candelabras are still used in homes as decorative elements or to add atmosphere on special occasions.

Religious use 

Candles and candlesticks are also used frequently in religious rituals and for spiritual means as both functional and symbolic lights.

In Jewish homes, two candles are lit to mark the beginning of the Sabbath at sundown every Friday, hence, candlesticks are often on display. A seven-branched candelabra, known as the menorah, is the national symbol of the State of Israel, based on the candelabra that was used in the Temple in Jerusalem in ancient times. Another special candelabra found in many Jewish homes is the Hanukiah, the Hanukkah menorah that holds eight candles plus an extra one for lighting the others.

Tall candlesticks and altar lamps are often found in Christian churches as well.

A special set of two- and three-branched candelabras called the dikirion and trikirion is used by Eastern Catholic and Eastern Orthodox bishops to bless people at worship services.

A triple candlestick was used before 1955 in the Catholic Church.

See also 
 Bobèche
 Gloucester Candlestick
 Hogscraper candlestick

References

External links 

 
Candlesticks at the Cooper Hewitt, Smithsonian Design Museum
Candlesticks at the University of Michigan Museum of Art
Candlesticks at the Birmingham Museum of Art
Candlesticks at the Detroit Institute of Arts

Candles
Lighting
Holders